The 7th Pennsylvania Regiment was an infantry unit raised on 4 January 1776 at Carlisle, Pennsylvania for service with the Continental Army under Brigadier General Anthony Wayne during the American Revolutionary War. The well known iron work owner and cannon supplier Samuel Van Leer was a captain in this regiment. On 17 January 1777 Lieutenant Colonel Thomas Hartley transferred out of the unit to take command of Hartley's Additional Continental Regiment. The 7th Regiment saw action at the battles of Brandywine, Paoli, Germantown, Monmouth, Springfield and Bull's Ferry. At Monmouth, Colonel William Irvine led the regiment. The unit merged with the 4th Pennsylvania Regiment on 17 January 1781.

References

External links
Bibliography of the Continental Army in Pennsylvania compiled by the United States Army Center of Military History

Pennsylvania regiments of the Continental Army
Military units and formations established in 1776
Military units and formations disestablished in 1781